Hiranya ("gold" in Sanskrit) may refer to:

Given name
Hiranya Peiris (born 1974), British astrophysicist
Hiranya Herath (born 1986), Sri Lankan lawyer and politician
Hiranyamayee Lama, Bhutanese politician, elected to the Tshogdu in 1979

Other
Hiranya, a 2009 album by Merzbow
Hiranyakeshi river, a tributary of the Ghataprabha River in India

See also
Hiranyagarbha ("golden womb/egg"), a term for the source of universal creation in Vedic philosophy 
Hiranyagarbha (donation), an ancient Indian ceremony of donating a golden vessel
Hiranyakashipu ("clothed in gold"), an Asura mentioned in the Puranas
Hiranyaksha ("golden-eyed"), an Asura
Hiranya Varna Mahavihar ("Golden Great Monastery"), a Buddhist vihara in Patan, Nepal